is a train station on the Kyoto Municipal Subway Karasuma Line in Kita-ku, Kyoto, Japan.

Lines

 (Station Number: K03)

History
The station opened on October 24, 1990 when the Karasuma Line extension between Kitaōji and Kitayama completed. Until June 3, 1997, the station was the terminus of the line.

Layout
The underground station has one island platform serving two tracks. The tracks are on the second basement and the concourse is on the first basement.

References

Railway stations in Kyoto Prefecture